Paul Di Leo is an American bassist who has worked with such bands as Nena, Adrenaline Mob, and Fozzy.

Musical career

Nena
Di Leo has been a member of Nena since 2001 and is still touring with the singer in Germany and abroad. He also took part in the making of several Nena's masterpieces such as Willst Du Mit Mir Gehn  or Made In Germany and was awarded gold and platinum records.

Adrenaline Mob

In 2011, Di Leo joined the newly formed band, Adrenaline Mob. A self-described heavy metal "supergroup", with fellow members being a who's who of rock/metal musicians; Rich Ward (of Stuck Mojo and Fozzy), Mike Portnoy (of Dream Theater), Russell Allen (of Symphony X) and Mike Orlando.

In January 2012; citing a need to concentrate on other projects, he and Rich Ward left the band.

Fozzy
With Sean Delson's announcement to "retire" from Fozzy, to pursue other musical interests; Fozzy announced Di Leo as Delson's replacement, on September 9, 2011. Di Leo was already known to the group, as he played with Fozzy co-founder, Rich Ward, in Adrenaline Mob. Di Leo's first show as a member of Fozzy was at the House of Blues, in Paradise, Nevada, on October 15.

A month later, Fozzy (with Di Leo) landed in the United Kingdom for their "The Madness Returns - Winter 2011" tour. The band played back-to-back shows in Reading, Southampton, Cardiff, Leeds, Nottingham, Glasgow, York, Wrexham, Plymouth, High Wycombe and Brighton, between the dates of November 2–13, before departing to tour in Germany, the Netherlands and Denmark.

On January 18, 2012, Fozzy announced that they had signed with Century Media Records and subsequent plans to release their fifth studio album during the Summer. Fozzy's fifth studio album and debut with Century Media is entitled Sin and Bones and is set for an August release. On July 10, Fozzy released their first single from their new album, as "Sandpaper" (featuring M. Shadows of Avenged Sevenfold) was published onto YouTube with an "Evolution of Fozzy" video. "Sandpaper" became available for download on iTunes on July 17.

Despite his absence on stage, Di Leo recorded three albums with the band: Sin and Bones in 2011, Do You Wanna Start a War in 2014 and Judas in 2017.

Awards and recognition

Gold Record Award
2002: Nena feat. Nena
2005: Willst du mit mir gehn
2009: Made in Germany

Platinum Record Award
2002: Nena feat. Nena
2005: Willst du mit mir gehn

References

External links
 Official website
 https://www.instagram.com/pauliedileo/?hl=en

American heavy metal bass guitarists
American male bass guitarists
American rock bass guitarists
Fozzy members
Living people
Songwriters from New Jersey
Guitarists from New Jersey
Year of birth missing (living people)